Buck 65 is a Hip hop artist from Nova Scotia, Canada.

Discography

Studio albums 
Buck 65
 Game Tight (1994)
 Year Zero (1996)
 Weirdo Magnet (1996)
 Language Arts (1996)
 Vertex (1998)
 Man Overboard (Anticon, 2001)
 Synesthesia (Endemik, 2001)
 Square (WEA, 2002)
 Talkin' Honky Blues (WEA, 2003)
 Secret House Against the World (WEA, 2005)
 Situation (Strange Famous, 2007)
 20 Odd Years (WEA, 2011)
 Laundromat Boogie (2014)
 Neverlove (2014)

Bike for Three! (Buck 65 with Greetings from Tuskan)
 More Heart Than Brains (Anticon, 2009)
 So Much Forever (Fake Four Inc., 2014)

Sebutones (Buck 65 with Sixtoo)
 Psoriasis [EP] (1996)
 50/50 Where It Counts (1997)

Mixtapes 
 Strong Arm (2006)
 Dirtbike Vol.1 (2008)
 Dirtbike Vol.2 (2008)
 Dirtbike Vol.3 (2008)
 Dirtbike Vol.4 (2015)

Maxis 
 Dirtbike (2008)
 Unhip (2010)
 20 Odd Years-Vol. 1 Avant (2011)
 20 Odd Years-Vol. 2 Distance (2011)
 20 Odd Years-Vol. 3 Albuquerque (2011)
 20 Odd Years-Vol. 4 Cenotaph (2011)

Singles 
 "Stolen Bass" (1994)
 "Sebutone Def" (1997) (Sebutones)
 "The Wildlife" (1998)
 "The Centaur" (1999)
 "Wicked & Weird" (2003)
 "463" (2004)
 "Sore" (2004)
 "Devil's Eyes" (2005)
 "Way Back When" (2007)
 "Dang" (2008)

Videos 
 "To Mock a Killingbird" (1998) from "Sebutone Def"
 "Pants on Fire" (2001) from Man Overboard
 "Phil" (2003) from Square
 "Wicked & Weird" (2003) from Talkin' Honky Blues
 "463" (2004) from Talkin' Honky Blues
 "Kennedy Killed the Hat" (2005) from Secret House Against the World
 "Devil's Eyes" (2005) from Secret House Against the World
 "Dang" (2008) from Situation
 "Shutter Buggin'" (2008) from Situation
 "Zombie Delight" (2011) from 20 Odd Years
 "Paper Airplanes" (2011) from 20 Odd Years
 "Who by Fire" (2013) from 20 Odd Years
 "Super Pretty Naughty" (2014) from Neverlove

Guest appearances 
 The Goods - "Inspectators" from Secondary Education (1998)
 Sixtoo - "Sebutones Resurgence" from The Psyche Intangible (1998)
 Sixtoo - "The Canada Project" from Songs I Hate (and Other People Moments) (2000)
 Al Tuck - The New High Road of Song (2001)
 Boom Bip - "The Unthinkable" from Seed to Sun (2002)
 Stigg of the Dump - "Five Dollar Jesus" and "Pointing Fingers" from Still Alive at the Veglia Lounge (2002)
 Omid - "Double Header" from Monolith (2003)
 L'Armée des 12 - "Néons & Pierres Précieuses" from Cadavres Exquis (2002)
 Gravité Zero - "Trou noir" from Gravité Zero (2003)
 DJ Signify - "Stranded", "Winter's Going", "Red to Black", and "Where Did She Go?" from Sleep No More (2004)
 Feist - "One Evening" video (2005)
 North American Hallowe'en Prevention Initiative - "Do They Know It's Hallowe'en?" (2005)
 Matt Mays - "When the Angels Make Contact" from When the Angels Make Contact (2006)
 Hip Club Groove - "Shootin the Gift" from Trailer Park Hip Hop (1994)
 k-os - "Ballad for Noah" from Atlantis: Hymns for Disco (2006)
 Tagaq - "Gentle" and "Want" from Auk/Blood (2008)
 Classified - "Loonie" from Self Explanatory (2009)
 D-Sisive - "The Superbowl Is Over" from Let the Children Die (2009)
 Themselves - "Kick the Ball" from The Free Houdini (2009)
 Serengeti & Polyphonic - "La La Lala" from Terradactyl (2009)
 Awol One & Factor - "Daze Go Bye" from The Landmark (2011)
 Laura J Martin - "Kissbye Goodnight" from "Spy" b/w "Kissbye Goodnight" (2011)
 Metermaids (duo) - "Kill the Crow" from Rooftop Shake (2011)
 Meaghan Smith - "Baby, It's Cold Outside" from It Snowed (2011)
 Kristoff Krane - "Infectious" from Fanfaronade (2012)
 Cadence Weapon - "(You Can't Stop) The Machine" from Hope in Dirt City (2012)
 Jenn Grant - "Spades" from Compostela (2014)
 B. Dolan - "Jailbreak" from Kill The Wolf (2015) (also featuring Aesop Rock and Dave Lamb of Brown Bird)

Production credits 
 The Goods - "Inspectators" from Secondary Education (1998)
 Kunga 219 - "Returned" and "Things of Beauty" from Tharpa's Transcripts... A Time and a Place (2000)
 Sage Francis - "Got Up This Morning" from Human the Death Dance (2007)
 Sage Francis - "S.A.G.E. Bastard", "I Trusted You", "House of Bees" and "Be a Star" from Sick of Wasting (2009)
 Themselves - "The Mark (Buck 65 Remix)" from Crowns Down & Company (2010)
 Noah23 - "Motor Head" from Heart of Rock (2010)

Tracks appear on 
 "Untitled" on Music for the Advancement of Hip Hop (1999)
 "Pen Thief" on Giga Single (2001)
 "Pack Animal" on Tags of the Times 3 (2001)
 "Blood Pt. 2" on Dark Was the Night (2009)

References

External links 
 

Discographies of Canadian artists
Hip hop discographies